Edward Wester Creal (November 20, 1883 – October 13, 1943) was a U.S. Representative from Kentucky.

Born in a log house in LaRue County, Kentucky near Mount Sherman, Kentucky, Creal attended the public schools of Hart and LaRue Counties, Kentucky.
He taught school for nine years in LaRue County and between teaching terms attended Southern Normal School at Bowling Green, Kentucky, and East Lynn College at Buffalo, Kentucky.
He was graduated from the law department of Centre College in Danville, Kentucky, in 1906.
He was admitted to the bar in 1904 and commenced practice in Hodgenville, Kentucky, in 1910.
County superintendent of schools of LaRue County, Kentucky from 1910 to 1918.
County attorney 1918-1928.
Commonwealth attorney 1929-1936.
He was owner and publisher of a weekly newspaper in Hodgenville, Kentucky, from 1918 until the time of his death.
He served as member of the Democratic State executive committee 1924-1940.

Creal was elected as a Democrat to the Seventy-fourth Congress to fill the vacancy caused by the death of Cap R. Carden.
He was reelected to the Seventy-fifth and to the three succeeding Congresses and served from November 5, 1935, until his death in Hodgenville, Kentucky, on October 13, 1943.
He was interred in Red Hill Cemetery.

See also
 List of United States Congress members who died in office (1900–49)

References

1883 births
1943 deaths
People from Hodgenville, Kentucky
Centre College alumni
Democratic Party members of the United States House of Representatives from Kentucky
20th-century American politicians